Parisiana poetria is a work by the medieval English grammarian Johannes de Garlandia or John of Garland. Written about 1240, it is a textbook of the writing of Latin prose, classical verse and medieval (rhythmical) verse, aimed at his students at the University of Paris.

Bibliography

 Traugott Lawler, The Parisiana Poetria of John of Garland. New Haven: Yale University Press, 1974.
 Traugott Lawler, Parisiana poetria. Dumbarton Oaks Medieval Library 65. Cambridge, MA: Harvard University Press, 2020.

13th-century Latin books